Hong Kong Top Brand Awards (formerly known as Hong Kong Top Ten Brandnames Awards, renamed in 2004) is a competition held in the Hong Kong Products Expo.

Objectives
Hong Kong Top Brand Awards aims at giving recognition to outstanding brand names founded by Hong Kong companies, to encourage producers in pursuit of superiority, to promote Hong Kong products, and to augment the profile, both locally and internationally, of Hong Kong industry.

Eligibility
To be eligible, the entry brand name should be established in Hong Kong or have considerably intimate relations with Hong Kong, e.g.:
the brand name targeted at Hong Kong market for the most part;
the controlling shareholders of the entry company being Hong Kong residents;
the correlated products primarily manufactured in Hong Kong; or
the brand having noteworthy contribution to or influences on Hong Kong's industrial and economic development.
The entry brand name should have been registered with the Intellectual Property Department, HKSAR. Otherwise, the entry company should produce adequate proof to elucidate uniqueness and proprietorship of the brand name.
The entry entity should hold a valid Hong Kong Business Registration Certificate, and it must demonstrate to the fulfilment of the organizer that it has exclusive rights in regard to the manufacture or allocation of the entry brand name.
Previous winners of the Awards (including Hong Kong Top Brand and Hong Kong Premier Brand) are subject to a one-year moratorium and will recommence entitlement in the third year from the winning.

Rename and Introduction of new logos
From 2004, the Hong Kong Top Ten Brandnames Awards was renamed as "Hong Kong Top Brand Awards" and a brand-new logo has been implemented to reinstate the previous Award logo. The "Hong Kong Top Brand Mark" was designed under the supervision of the famous local designer, Kan Tai Keung (靳埭強). While retaining the fundamental features of previous "Top Mark", the new mark looks more internationalised, noticeable, fashionable and vibrant. On 2005 January 1, the previous Award logo will be totally suspended for any purpose. To reinforce the supervision of the use of logo, the Association also put the Hong Kong Top Brand Mark Scheme into practice autonomously, so as to bring in a unified identity system for Awardees, and to improve the reviewing process and continuing development of the Award.

Hong Kong Top Brand Mark
All awardees should account to the Organizer concerning products under the winning brands. For winners of "Hong Kong Top Brand Awards" and "Hong Kong Premier Brand Awards," they could apply for Hong Kong Top Brand Mark by product grouping and spirit, if meeting the evaluation requirements, be conferred a license to use the "Hong Kong Top Brand Mark" for dealing endorsement corresponding to the certified product categories, the winning company or brand name, e.g., printing on wrapping, commercials, letterhead, and other promo materials. The license is subject to renewal on an annual basis. If the winning company falls short to renew license for any product, it should not use the Mark in any case use the Mark or promote individual products by means of the awards; and they are required to evidently signify the entire title of the award, the year of conferment and the name of Organizer whenever quoting the award in literature.

For "Emerging Brand" and "The Most Popular Brand On-line," they are entitled to use the "Hong Kong Top Brand Mark" for promoting the general image of the winning company and brand name within one year, provided that the full title of the award is accordingly indicated.

Judging Criteria
 Assessment is primarily based on the following factors:
Reputation (Hong Kong, Mainland China & Overseas)
Product Distinctiveness
Novelty
Quality
Image and Packaging
Environmental Performance
Entries should go through a Preliminary Screening before entering the Final Judging, which in sequence consists of an interview by the Final Judging Panel and Public Polling. The Public Polling comprises On-line Polling and On-site Polling, which are held via Internet and at the Expo venue respectively. "The Most Popular Brand On-line" is selected mainly based on the result of the On-line Polling; while final decision on the other Award categories is based on review by Judging Panel with the results of On-site Polling and On-site Assessment taken into consideration.
All decisions made by the Judging Panel and the Organizer will be concluding and binding in all respects in all matters relating to the Award.

Award winners

1999
A-Fontane
Airland
Aji Ichiban
GP Batteries
Hang Heung
Knife Brand
Lee Kum Kee
Nin Jiom
Hoe Hin Pak Fah Yeow
Wing Wah

2000

Top Ten Brandnames
AXE
Crocodile
Eagle's
Goodway
Lion & Globe Brand
Long Far
Red A
Sau Tao Brand
Universe
Vitasoy

Most Popular Brandname On-line
Crocodile

2001

Top Ten Brandnames
Aqua Pure
Dai Pai Dong
Eu Yan Sang
Flower
Garden Bakeries
German Tops
Golden Elephant Brand
Maid Brand
Tung Rong Hung
Wai Yuen Tong

Emerging Brandname
Lo Hong Ka

Most Popular Brandname On-line
Dai Pai Dong

2002

The Honorary Award
A-Fontane

Top Ten Brandnames
Camel Brand
Chicks
Chow Tai Fook
Four Seas
Hung Fook Tong
Lamex
Lo Hong Ka
Neil Pryde
Red Lantern
Sea Horse

Emerging Brandname
LK

Most Popular Brandname On-line
Chow Tai Fook

2003

The Honorary Award
Eu Yan Sang
GP
Lion & Globe Brand

Top Ten Brandnames
3D-Gold
Amoy
Fortune
Golden Statue
Greendotdot
Maxim's
Octopus
Sau San Tong
Watsons Water
Weiyuen

Emerging Brandname
Ling Nam

Most Popular Brandname On-line
Sau San Tong

2004

Hong Kong Premier Brand
Aqua Pure
Lee Kum Kee

Hong Kong Top Brand
American Roses Brand
Doll noodle
FLUID
Fung Yip
Goods of Desire
German Pool
Imperial Bird's Nest
Luk Fook Jewellery
Saint Honore
San Miguel Brewery
Tien Chu

Emerging Brand
Tsit Wing

Most Popular Brand On-line
Lee Kum Kee

2008

Hong Kong Top Brand
Catalo
LK
Madame Pearl's
Mr. Juicy
Super Star
Taikoo
Tung Chun
Vita Green Lingzhi

References

External links
Hong Kong Product Expo official website
The Most Popular Brand On-line Polling
Parade of HK Top Brands: 2003, 2004

Hong Kong brands
Brand management